Anindilyakwa is an Australian Aboriginal language spoken by the Anindilyakwa people on Groote Eylandt and Bickerton Island in the Gulf of Carpentaria in the Northern Territory of Australia. Anindilyakwa is a multiple-classifying prefixing language in which all traditional nouns, adjectives, personal and demonstrative pronouns are prefixed for person, number and gender. According to the 2021 Australian Census, Anindilyakwa was spoken natively by 1,516 people, an increase from 1,283 in 2006.

Names
The local Anindilyakwa people refer to the language as Amamalya Ayakwa ( means 'true' and  means 'words'). However, Anindilyakwa is still commonly used.

Before linguists established orthography, people had spelt Anindilyakwa in multiple ways. These included Andiljangwa, Andilyaugwa, Aninhdhilyagwa, Enindiljaugwa, Enindhilyagwa, Wanindilyaugwa, Ingura, and Yingguru. It is also known as Groote Eylandt after its location.

Linguistic classification
Once considered a family level isolate, Van Egmond (2012) has demonstrated Anindilyakwa to be part of the Eastern branch of the Gunwinyguan family, relating it to Nunggubuyu and (more distantly) Ngandi, using correspondences between core vocabulary, verbal morphological forms, phonemes, and verbal inflectional paradigms.

Phonology

Vowels
The analysis of Anindilyakwa's vowels is open to interpretation. Stokes analyses it as having 4 phonemic vowels, . Leeding analyses it as having just 2, .

Consonants

Phonotactics
Anindilyakwa words almost always end with a final vowel 'a'. Clusters of up to 3 consonants such as 'ngw' can occur within words.

Grammar

Noun classes
Anindilyakwa has 5 noun classes, or genders, each marked by a prefix:

For bound pronouns, instead of "human male" and "non-human male" classes there is a single "male" class.

All traditional Anindilyakwa nouns carry a class prefix, but some loanwords may lack them.

Numerals
The language traditionally had numerals up to 20 but since the introduction of English, English words are now used almost exclusively for numbers above 5.

Anindilyakwa uses a quinary number system. The numbers are also adjectival and must be qualified with their corresponding noun class. 'One crocodile' becomes , '2 turtles' becomes .

There is no term for '"infinity", but the concept "innumerable" can be expressed by:  'there are too many stars to count.'

Adjectives 
Size degrees is done in 2 grades the positive and a diminutive, although reduplication of this word is possible for an intensifying effect.

Pronouns

Personal pronouns 
Anindilyakwa features 5 grammatical numbers for pronouns: singular, feminine dual, masculine dual, trial, and plural.

The language has a clusivity distinction common in many Aboriginal Australian languages –  'inclusive we' and  'exclusive we'. 'Inclusive we' includes explicitly the addressee (that is, 'you and I, and possibly others'). 'Exclusive we' excludes explicitly the addressee (that is, 'he/she/they and I, but not you'), regardless of who else may be involved.

Possessive pronouns 
With the exception of my, possessive pronouns in Anindilyakwa replace the -uwa suffix from the singular or plural pronouns with -langwa 'belonging to'.

For kinship nouns, there are 7 possessive suffixes used that distinguish between first, second and thirds, singular or plural numbers, and third person genders.

Language maintenance

Groote Eylandt Language Centre 
The Groote Eylandt Language Centre (GELC) promotes, maintains, and preserves Anindilyakwa. They are based in Angurugu with offices in Umbakumba and Bickerton Island. It hosts a significant collection of language and cultural resources relating to the Warnindilyakwa people. The Centre undertakes language projects both large and small and offers services such as language recording and resource development, language advice and expertise, and translation.

Previously known as Groote Eylandt Linguistics, Church Mission Society ran the department until 2006. The CMS created the orthography with the Latin script to translate Bible texts into Anindilyakwa. The centre now operates under the "Preserving Culture" department of the Anindilyakwa Land Council.

GELC has compiled and published the Anindilyakwa dictionary  "The Book about Everything", as well as producing an online dictionary, and a web app with the assistance of the Australian Literacy and Numeracy Foundation. They also run a YouTube channel with an expanding content of videos and resources in Anindilyakwa.

Lexicon

Macassan influence 

Makassar people from the region of Sulawesi (modern-day Indonesia) began visiting the coast of northern Australia sometime around the early to middle 1700s. This happened yearly until the introduction of the White Australia Policy in 1906. The Macassans visited Groote Eylandt for trade, particularly for highly prized trepang in the South China Sea. The Macassans also brought with them tamarinds, dugout canoes, tobacco and beer. Evan analyses that there are potentially 35 Makassarese words, mostly nouns, that have entered the Anindilyakwa language, including many place names such as Umbakumba (Malay word  for 'lapping of waves') and Bartalumba Bay (Macassan word  for 'the big rock').

Questions

Animals

In popular culture

Music 

 Emily Wurramara is an ARIA-nominated Anindilyakwa singer and songwriter from Groote Eylandt. She writes and sings songs in both English and Anindilyakwa. 
 Yilila is a band from Numbulwar. Lead vocalist Grant Nundhirribala is a master of traditional music and a highly respected song man and dancer. The band performs their music in Wubuy, Anindilyakwa, Maccassan language and English.
 Other noteworthy bands include Mambali from Numbulwar, Groote Eylandt Band from Angurugu and Salt Lake Band from Umbakumba.

Film and television 

 The Last Wave (released in the USA as Black Rain) is a 1977 Australian mystery drama film directed by Peter Weir where a white lawyer represents a group of Aboriginal men accused of murder. Also starring Yolngu man David Gulpilil, local Anindilyakwa men Nandjiwarra Amagula, Walter, Roy Bara, Cedrick Lalara, and Morris Lalara portray the men on trial.
Bakala is a 2017 award-winning short film written and directed by Nikolas Lachajczak and told entirely in the Anindilyakwa language. It follows the story of Anindilyakwa man, Steve 'Bakala' Wurramara, who is afflicted with Machado-Joseph Disease (MJD), a hereditary neurodegenerative disorder that results in a lack of muscle control and coordination of the upper and lower extremities.
Anija is a 2011 award-winning short film written and directed by David Hansen. It is filmed mainly in the Anindilyakwa language and follows the experiences of one family dealing with the effects of alcohol addiction. The film won Best Indigenous Resource at the Australian Teachers of Media (ATOM) Awards in 2011.
Anindilyakwa was featured in Spread the Word, an Indigenous Australian languages show on The Disney Channel. The show featured the Anindilyakwa word  which translates to 'kicking a tree to get something off of it.'

Commemoration 

 In 2019 the Royal Australian Mint issued a 50 cent coin to celebrate the International Year of Indigenous Languages which features 14 different words for 'money' from Australian Indigenous languages including  for Anindilyakwa. The coin was designed by Aleksandra Stokic in consultation with Indigenous language custodian groups.

References

External links
Anindilyakwa in the Groote Eylandt Language Centre
Entries for Enindhilyagwa from Rosetta Project, stored in the Internet Archive
State of Indigenous Languages in Australia (2001). Department of the Environment and Heritage.

Gunwinyguan languages
Groote Eylandt